Vega Intl. Night School is the third album by American electronic music band Neon Indian. It was released on October 16, 2015, by Mom + Pop Music. The album title was an intentional nod to Alan Palomo's other music project, titled Vega, for which he has produced only a single EP. Noticing that ideas from both Neon Indian and Vega were merging, Palomo decided to combine the two projects into one and retire the use of the Vega moniker.

Critical reception

Vega Intl. Night School received generally positive reviews from music critics. At Metacritic, which assigns a normalized rating out of 100 to reviews from mainstream publications, the album received an average score of 79, based on 17 reviews. Praising "the most rewarding of danceable peaks" in the album's middle section, Calum Slingerland of Exclaim! wrote that "Palomo's four-year absence has yielded a flashy, fun record with welcome diversity".

After noting that "there's plenty of Tom Tom Club and Blondie in the album's bubbly disco", Heather Phares of AllMusic said, "In its own way, VEGA INTL. Night School is just as immersive as Neon Indian's previous work and even more impressionistic, with a flamboyance that makes it a captivating standout within his own work as well as his contemporaries".
 
Rolling Stone reviewer Renato Pagnani said, "Palomo peels back the layers of psychedelia that have sometimes obscured his work in the past, striving for a directness that results in the most crystallized – and accessible – version of his aesthetic yet".

Sasha Geffen of Consequence of Sound praised "the sequence of 'Slumlord' into 'Slumlord's Re-lease' and 'Techno Clique'", declaring that it 
"proves to be Night School'''s centerpiece and the most concrete realization yet of Neon Indian as pure electronic music".

Year-end lists

Track listing

Personnel
Credits adapted from the liner notes of Vega Intl. Night School''.

Musicians

 Alan Palomo – all vocals; Fender Rhodes electric piano 
 Jorge Palomo – bass ; guitar 
 Alex Epton – drum programming ; percussion 
 Ben Allen – guitar ; drum programming 
 Morgan Wiley – outro Minimoog keyboard ; Rhodes Chroma keyboard ; Korg PS-3100 keyboard intro ; piano 
 Nicole Brenny, Gryphon Graham, Eliza Walton, Austin Brown, John Jacobson, Kai Flanders, Lanneau White – partygoes in background 
 Chris Coombs – guitar 
 W. Andrew Raposo - Fender Rhodes electric piano 
 Nick Millhiser – drums 
 Mark Cobb – percussion 
 Abe Seiferth – additional guitar 
 Jason Faries – drums 
 Josh Ascalon – outro noise textures 
 Brandi Ullian – back-up vocals

Technical

 Alan Palomo – production ; engineering 
 Alex Epton – mixing ; additional production ; engineering 
 Sumner Jones – engineering ; outro mixing 
 Ben Allen – additional production ; mixing 
 Josh Ascalon – engineering 
 W. Andrew Raposo – engineering 
 Eric Broucek – engineering 
 Jordan Richardson – engineering 
 Heba Kadry – mastering at Timeless Mastering, Brooklyn, New York

Artwork
 Robert Beatty – artwork, design, art direction
 Luke Lanter – cover photo
 Alan Palomo – art direction

Charts

References

2015 albums
Mom + Pop Music albums
Neon Indian albums
Transgressive Records albums
Albums produced by Ben H. Allen
Disco albums by American artists
Vaporwave albums